The Valdostan regional election of 1993 took place on 6 June 1993.

The Valdostan Union made an agreement with the Democratic Party of the Left.

Results

Sources: Regional Council of Aosta Valley and Istituto Cattaneo

Elections in Aosta Valley
1993 elections in Italy
June 1993 events in Europe